Visualization or visualisation may refer to:
Visualization (graphics), the physical or imagining creation of images, diagrams, or animations to communicate a message
 Data visualization, the graphic representation of data
 Information visualization, the study of visual representations of abstract data 
 Music visualization, animated imagery based on a piece of music
Mental image, the experience of images without the relevant external stimuli
 "Visualization", a song by Blank Banshee on the 2012 album Blank Banshee 0

See also
 Creative visualization (disambiguation)
 Visualizer (disambiguation)
 
 
 
 Graphics
 List of graphical methods, various forms of visualization
 Guided imagery, a mind-body intervention by a trained practitioner 
 Illustration, a decoration, interpretation or visual explanation of a text, concept or process
 Image, an artifact that depicts visual perception, such as a photograph or other picture
 Infographics